The Lubin mine is a large mine in the west of Poland in Lubin, Lubin County, 347 km south-west of the capital, Warsaw. Lubin represents one of the largest copper and silver reserve in Poland having estimated reserves of 347 million tonnes of ore grading 1.26% copper and 58 g/tonnes silver. The annual ore production is around 7.3 million tonnes from which 92,000 tonnes of copper and 423 tonnes of silver are extracted.

References

External links 
 Official site

Copper mines in Poland
Lubin County